Kenneth E. Gruennert (November 19, 1922 – December 24, 1942) was a United States Army soldier and a recipient of the United States military's highest decoration—the Medal of Honor—for his actions in World War II.

Biography 

Born in Helenville, Wisconsin, on November 19, 1922, Gruennert attended Jefferson High School in nearby Jefferson. During high school he played football and was captain of the school's championship-winning team. At age 16, he enlisted in the Wisconsin Army National Guard from Helenville and served in the 32nd Infantry Division.

The 32nd Division was federalized in 1940, and after the attack on Pearl Harbor the unit began training for combat. On December 24, 1942, Gruennert was fighting the Japanese in the Battle of Buna-Gona in New Guinea as a sergeant with Company L of the 127th Infantry Regiment. Near the village of Buna, he was second-in-command of a platoon tasked with advancing through Japanese positions to a beach  ahead. When they came upon a Japanese bunker, Gruennert single-handedly attacked and silenced the enemy soldiers' position. Although seriously wounded, he refused medical evacuation and successfully attacked a second bunker, but was killed by a sniper immediately after. For these actions, he was posthumously awarded the Medal of Honor ten months later, on October 11, 1943.

Gruennert, aged 20 at his death, was buried at Evergreen Cemetery in his hometown of Helenville.

Medal of Honor citation 

Sergeant Gruennert's official Medal of Honor citation reads:

See also 

 List of Medal of Honor recipients
 List of Medal of Honor recipients for World War II

References 

 

1922 births
1942 deaths
United States Army personnel killed in World War II
United States Army Medal of Honor recipients
People from Jefferson County, Wisconsin
United States Army soldiers
Military personnel from Wisconsin
World War II recipients of the Medal of Honor